Argyrotaenia citharexylana is a species of moth of the family Tortricidae. It is found in Colombia and Costa Rica.

Based on the examination of 3,850 females of 1,082 species from 267 genera, the number of bristles in females varies from one to eight and frequently is asymmetrical on the same specimen (19% of specimens examined). A three-bristled frenulum (i.e., with three bristles on each side) is the most common condition in the Arotropora Meyrick group (100% of females examined), Epitymbiini (96%), Orthocomotis Dognin group (92%), Mictopsichia Hübner group (88%), Atteriini (83%), Tortricini (82%), Sparganothini (78%), Phricanthini (73%), Euliini (71%), Archipini (62%), Cnephasiini (61%), and Schoenotenini (51%). In Cochylini a two-bristled frenulum is the most common condition (i.e., 59% of all females examined). In Ceracini a four-bristled frenulum is the most common condition (i.e., 37%), with the vast majority of individuals possessing four or more bristles on at least one side; only 4% had three bristles (both sides). Although variation is rampant at the species, generic, and tribal levels, the data suggest a strong tendency for the reduction of bristles in Cochylini, where two (both sides) is the dominant condition; the addition of bristles in Ceracini, where four bristles is the most common condition; and more bristles in the largest species (e.g., Choristoneura conflictana (Walker), Zacorisca electrina (Meyrick), and Varifula sp.).

References

C
Moths of Central America
Moths described in 1866